The Taganrog Iron & Steel Factory (TAGMET) is the largest manufacturer of steel pipes in the South of Russia. It was founded in 1896 as the Taganrog Metallurgical Company, a Russian-Belgian joint-stock company. The Azov-Don Bank, a Taganrog based commercial bank was instrumental in financing the original company, and Boris Kamenka of that bank was appointed to its board.

In 2002 Alfa-Eko increased its stake in TAGMET from 25% to 42% by acquiring when it acquired the interests of the Petrovsky Bank.

References

1896 establishments in the Russian Empire
Mechanical engineering companies of Russia
Buildings and structures in Taganrog
Steel companies of the Russian Soviet Federative Socialist Republic